Tsuko Yamashita (5 January 1899 – 12 July 1987) was a Japanese educator and politician. She was one of the first group of women elected to the House of Representatives in 1946.

Biography
Yamashita was born in Kumamoto in 1899. She was educated at Nara Girls' Higher Normal School, after which she became a teacher, teaching at Kumamoto First Girls' High School and in Nagasaki. She also became a leader of the Mothers' League.

After World War II, Yamashita was an independent candidate in Kumamoto in the 1946 general elections (the first in which women could vote), and was elected to the House of Representatives. Following the elections Yamashita joined the Japan Socialist Party. She lost her seat in the 1947 elections and ran unsuccessfully in the 1956 House of Councillors elections. She died in 1987.

References

1899 births
People from Kumamoto
Japanese schoolteachers
Members of the House of Representatives (Japan)
Social Democratic Party (Japan) politicians
1987 deaths
20th-century Japanese politicians
20th-century Japanese women politicians